The United League of Arakan (ULA)  is an Arakanese political organisation based in Laiza, Kachin State, Myanmar. Its armed wing is the Arakan Army. Major General Twan Mrat Naing is the ULA's chairman and Brigadier General Nyo Twan Awng is in the secretary. The United League of Arakan is the member of the Federal Political Negotiation and Consultative Committee (FPNCC), the political negotiation team formed by seven ethnic armed groups in Myanmar.

History
The 1st United League of Arakan conference, attended by delegates from various countries, was  held from 10 to 16 January 2016, seven consecutive days in a liberated area. The ULA was organised by the 21 central committee members who Chairman, General Secretary, Secretary (1), Secretary (2), Secretary (3), Special Advisory Group. Twan Mrat Naing is responsible the chairman of United League of Arakan and Nyo Twan Awng is in charge of the secretariat. No other names announced.

Controversy
The Singaporean police force arrested those who were involved in the United League of Arakan's movements and they were deported back to Myanmar on 10 July 2019. Myanmar police detained and arrested Arakanese youths repatriated from Singapore at Rangoon airport.
In the Myanmar police force complaint the United League of Arakan led by Aung Myat Kyaw, who was the younger brother of Twan Mrat Naing, and three others Tun Aye, Than Tun Naing and Soe Soe was established in Singapore in 2013. There were about 86 members. Police allege that the members monthly pay the fees and they supported the monthly fees to the United League of Arakan and Arakan Army.

However, the United League of Arakan was formed only in 2016, according to the Mrauk-U survey book. The book was written by Maung Maung Soe who received the Myanmar National Literature Award for 2017.

References

External links 
(1) United League of Arakan's Old Website
(2) United League of Arakan's Old Website
(3) United League of Arakan's Old Website
(4) United League of Arakan's Old Website

History of Myanmar
Politics of Myanmar
Rebel groups in Myanmar
2013 establishments in Myanmar